Salir del clóset is a 2022 Peruvian documentary film written and directed by Alberto Castro. It presents stories and testimonials from ten gay men and the difficulties they faced in freely assuming their sexual orientation.

Synopsis 
10 Peruvian homosexual men will narrate their experiences after discovering their gender identity. The film demonstrates the hard difficulties they are going through due to institutionalized homophobia in Peru. It also raises various issues that reflect on tolerance and respect for diversity.

Cast 

 Bruno García-Calderón
 Josué Parodi
 Paco Flores
 Marcelo Cicala
 Gino Lorenzo
 Joaco Ahumada
 Eduardo Villanueva
 Lucho Mora
 Iván Pérez
 Omar Olivos

Release 
It was initially released as part of the National Selection of the Cinema Week of the University of Lima 2022. After having won the National Contest for the Distribution and Circulation of Works 2022 of the Ministry of Culture, the film was scheduled to be released on January 28, 2023, in Peruvian theaters, but the premiere was brought forward to January 17, 2023, for theaters Peruvians from the Cineplanet chain.

References 

2022 films
2022 documentary films
2022 LGBT-related films
2020s Spanish-language films
2020s Peruvian films
Peruvian documentary films
Peruvian LGBT-related films
Documentary films about gay men
Documentary films about LGBT culture